Karnataka State Highway 1, commonly referred to as KA SH 1, is a normal state highway that runs north through Udupi, Shimoga, Haveri, Dharwad and Belgaum districts in the state of Karnataka.  This state highway touches numerous cities and villages Viz.Karkala, Agumbe, Thirthahalli and Dharwad. The total length of the highway is 450 km.

Summary

Distance Chart 
Highway connecting Padubedri with Chickalaguda via Karkala, Agumbe, Thirthahalli, Anandapura, Hangal, Thadasa, Kalghatagi, Dharwad, Uppinabetegeri, Belawadi, Bailahongala, Vannuru, Hoskoti, Ankalagi, Basapura, Hidkal Dam and Hosur. Total 450 kilometres approx

Route description 
The route followed by this highway is Padubidri - Karkala - Agumbe - Thirthahalli - Konanduru- Anandapura - Hangal - Tadas - Kalghatgi - Dharwad - Uppinbetageri - Belawadi - Bailahongal - Vannuru - Hoskatti - Ankalgi - Basapura - Hidakal Dam - Hosur - Chikalgud

Major junctions

National Highways 
 NH 13 at Karkala
 NH 13 at Thirthahalli
 NH 206 at Anandapura
 NH 63 at Kalghatgi
 NH 66 at Padubidri(starting point]

State Highways 
 KA SH 65 at Agumbe
 KA SH 52 at Thirthahalli
 KA SH 26 at Riponpet
 KA SH 77 at Anandapura
 KA SH 62 and KA SH 48 at Siralkoppa
 KA SH 69 at Tadas
 KA SH 46 at Kalghatgi
 KA SH 73 and KA SH 28 at Dharwad
 KA SH 30 and KA SH 73 at Belawadi
 KA SH 31 at Bailahongal
 KA SH 103 at Murgod

Connections 
Many villages, cities and towns in various districts are connected by this state highway.

See also
 List of State Highways in Karnataka

References

State Highways in Karnataka
Roads in Udupi district
Roads in Shimoga district
Roads in Haveri district
Roads in Dharwad
Roads in Dharwad district